WEEL could refer to:

Weel, a hamlet in the East Riding of Yorkshire, England
weel, a type of fish trap
WEEL-LD, a low-power television station (channel 22) licensed to serve Tuscaloosa, Alabama, United States; see List of television stations in Alabama
WARB, a radio station (700 AM) licensed to Dothan, Alabama, known as WEEL from 2007 to 2010
WVKF, a radio station (95.7 FM) licensed to Shadyside, Ohio, United States, known as WEEL from 1990 to 2004
WDCT, a radio station (1310 AM) licensed to Fairfax, Virginia, United States, known as WEEL from 1962 to 1985
WEEL, acronym for "Workplace Environmental Exposure Level" see Threshold limit value